In Poland, Railroad Guards (SOK) is a uniformed militarized government organization, a Polish railroad police. Its primary functions are:
maintaining law and order within the railroad territory and in railway transport
guarding the life and health safety, as well as property security.

Rank badges

Other

References

External links 

 http://www.kgsok.pl/ - official website

Government railway authorities
Rail transport in Poland
Railroad police agencies
Railway safety